L'éclat du ciel était insoutenable is the first album by the Canadian post-rock band Hrsta.

Track listing
 "L'éclat du ciel était insoutenable" ["The Glare of the Sky Was Unbearable"]
 "Lime Kiln"
 "Don't Let the Angels Fall"
 "City of Gold"
 "I Can Transform Myself Into Anyone I Want"
 "Jakominiplatz"
 "21-87"
 "Silver Planes"
 "Blessed Are We Who Seem to Be Losers"
 "Lucy's Sad"
 "City of Gold (Reprise)"
 "Whip"
 "Novi Beograd" [New Belgrade]

References

External links
 Album info on Alien8

2001 albums
Alien8 Recordings albums
Hrsta albums